Ted Merriman, S.V.M., is a Canadian politician and member of the Saskatchewan Party. He represented the electoral district of Saskatoon Northwest in the Legislative Assembly of Saskatchewan from 2003 to 2007.

His son Paul Merriman was subsequently elected to the Legislative Assembly in 2011.

In April 2014, he was awarded the Saskatchewan Volunteer Medal for his volunteer work over many years in Saskatchewan.

pp

References

Living people
Saskatchewan Party MLAs
Politicians from Saskatoon
21st-century Canadian politicians
Year of birth missing (living people)